Darko Đurđević (also transliterated Djurdjević; born 29 November 1987) is a Serbian footballer who plays for Mladost Velika Obarska in the Premier League of Bosnia and Herzegovina, as a defensive midfielder.

In the summer of 2011, Djurdjević signed for Portuguese side C.D. Santa Clara. Djurdjević made his debut for the Açoreanos on the 11 September 2011 against Tirsense in a 2012–13 Taça de Portugal second round tie.

References

External links
 
 
 

1987 births
Living people
Sportspeople from Valjevo
Serbian footballers
Association football midfielders
Serbian SuperLiga players
FK Mladost Lučani players
FK Sloga Doboj players
FK Mladi Radnik players
Liga Portugal 2 players
C.D. Santa Clara players
Serbian expatriate footballers
Expatriate footballers in Portugal
Serbian expatriate sportspeople in Portugal